Tolono is a village in Tolono Township, Champaign County, Illinois, United States. The population was 3,604 at the 2020 census.  Its name was fabricated by J.B. Calhoun, land commission of the Illinois Central Railroad, who wrote about it simply: "[I] placed the vowel o three times, thus o-o-o, and filling in with the consonants t-l-n."

Geography
Tolono is located at  (39.986046, -88.259727). According to the history of Champaign County: A surveyor for the Illinois Central who was looking for a division headquarters, surveyed the Tolono area and wrote on a map 'too low, No.' and that became the name of the town established there. Tolono at one time had two or three companies making tile used to drain the land around the town, resulting in swamps on the east side of the town both on the north and south side of the Wabash Railroad.

According to the 2021 census gazetteer files, Tolono has a total area of ,all land.

Demographics

As of the 2020 census there were 3,604 people, 1,150 households, and 789 families residing in the village. The racial makeup of the village was 91.12% White, 1.11% African American, 0.47% Native American, 0.42% Asian, 0.03% Pacific Islander, 1.14% from other races, and 5.72% from two or more races. Hispanic or Latino of any race were 2.61% of the population.

There were 1,150 households, out of which 67.13% had children under the age of 18 living with them, 45.57% were married couples living together, 18.09% had a female householder with no husband present, and 31.39% were non-families. 26.96% of all households were made up of individuals, and 6.52% had someone living alone who was 65 years of age or older. The average household size was 3.34 and the average family size was 2.66.

The village's age distribution consisted of 26.1% under the age of 18, 12.6% from 18 to 24, 27.6% from 25 to 44, 27% from 45 to 64, and 6.7% who were 65 years of age or older. The median age was 34.6 years. For every 100 females, there were 75.4 males. For every 100 females age 18 and over, there were 70.5 males.

The median income for a household in the village was $62,788, and the median income for a family was $92,452. Males had a median income of $55,521 versus $31,643 for females. The per capita income for the village was $26,693. About 10.5% of families and 13.2% of the population were below the poverty line, including 16.4% of those under age 18 and 30.4% of those age 65 or over.

History 

Founded in the early 19th century as a result of the land-grant Illinois Central Railroad's expansion southward, Tolono was initially home to many railroad employees.  Many streets bear the names of the IC's administrative staff.  The original homes in the community were small and narrow filling half lots adjacent to the railroad tracks.  With the intersection of an east-west railway, Tolono became a featured stop for early rail passengers.  The peak of the railroad's passenger influence in Tolono occurred when Tolono became the last stop in Illinois for Abraham Lincoln as he bid farewell to his home state in a speech given from the back of his coach.

In 1959, Tolono became home to the first Monical's Pizza restaurant.  Although the original location does not bear the Monical's name any longer, the buildings still stand and another Monical's Pizza is operated less than a block away.  Members of the entrepreneurial Monical family still reside in the village today.

After shooting in several locations in Tolono in 2006, Mark Roberts, a Tolono native, wrapped production on his feature-length movie "Welcome To Tolono".  The film was highlighted on the 2007 film festival circuit. Welcome To Tolono focuses on an Alcoholics Anonymous group that meets in the basement of a Tolono church.

Notable people 

 Brian Cardinal, NBA forward, who led the league in True Shooting Percentage in 2003-04
 George Washington Burr, Major General during World War I
 Mark Roberts, screenwriter, playwright, producer, actor, and comedian; best known for creating the American sitcom Mike & Molly
 Rocky Ryan, NFL player with the Philadelphia Eagles and Chicago Bears

Schools
Community Unit School District # 7 or Unit Seven Schools is a district that services preschool through twelfth grade in the greater Tolono area. The school district covers  covering the communities of Tolono, Philo, Sidney, Sadorus, and Pesotum. In August 2002, there were three new schools, Unity East Elementary (approximately 300 students from Sidney and Philo), Unity West Elementary (approximately 400 students from Pesotum, Sadorus, and Tolono), and Unity Junior High (approximately 200 students district-wide) featuring the Rocket Center gymnasium. Along with the existing High School, there are now four schools instead of seven.

References

Bibliography

External links

 history of Tolono, Illinois
 https://web.archive.org/web/20080516230234/http://welcometotolono.com/

Villages in Champaign County, Illinois
Villages in Illinois